David Van Alstyne (January 3, 1897 – October 10, 1985) was an American politician who served in the New Jersey General Assembly from 1940 to 1941 and in the New Jersey Senate from 1943 to 1953.

He died of a heart attack on October 10, 1985, at his home in Englewood, New Jersey at age 88.

References

1897 births
1985 deaths
Republican Party New Jersey state senators
Republican Party members of the New Jersey General Assembly
Majority leaders of the New Jersey Senate
Presidents of the New Jersey Senate
People from Englewood, New Jersey
Politicians from Louisville, Kentucky
20th-century American politicians